Hans Baumann (born December 26, 1932) is a former German bobsledder who competed at the 1968 Winter Olympics. In Grenoble he was a member of the West German four-man bobsleigh team, alongside Wolfgang Zimmerer, Stefan Gaisreiter, and Peter Utzschneider, that finished ninth in the event among nineteen squads. He was born in Munich and was a member of Bobclub München.

References

1932 births
Living people
German male bobsledders
Bobsledders at the 1968 Winter Olympics
Olympic bobsledders of West Germany